Mutual Lifestyle Radio was a radio network launched by the Mutual Broadcasting System. It was created in the early 1970s as Mutual Progressive Network (a.k.a. MPN) when Mutual, having lost their lawsuit attempting to prevent ABC from splitting into four radio networks in 1968, decided to take a similar tactic, also launching Mutual Black Network (a.k.a. MBN), Mutual Cadena Hispánica (translated to "Mutual Spanish Network"), & Mutual Southwest Network. The network was re-branded in 1980 and subsequently abandoned in 1983.

Mutual Lifestyle Radio aired an hourly newscast at 55 minutes past the hour, which focused primarily on "" and  stories aimed at contemporary and AOR radio audiences. The newscast was originally branded "Progressive News" to differentiate itself from the "Comprehensive News" that aired on the hour and half-hour.

American radio programs
Defunct radio networks in the United States
Mutual Broadcasting System
Radio stations disestablished in 1983